Walter Rutherford Peterson Jr. (September 19, 1922 – June 1, 2011) was an American realtor, educator, and Republican politician from Peterborough, New Hampshire, who served in the New Hampshire House of Representatives and two terms as the 72nd governor of New Hampshire from 1969 to 1973.

Early life
Peterson was born September 19, 1922 in Nashua, New Hampshire, and graduated from Nashua High School and New Hampton School. He attended the College of William & Mary and the University of New Hampshire and graduated from Dartmouth College in 1947. Peterson left his college studies to fulfill four years' service as a United States Navy Reserve officer in the South Pacific during World War II. After graduating from Dartmouth College, Peterson became a partner in The Petersons, Inc., a real estate firm in Peterborough, New Hampshire where he and family members worked until the late 1990s.

He married Dorothy Donovan in 1949. They had two children, Margaret and Andrew.

Political career
Peterson joined New Hampshire state politics in 1961 where he served as a representative and House Speaker.

Governorship
Peterson, a moderate Republican, was governor from 1969–1973; in a period when the state was experiencing rapid growth and looking for ways to fund new infrastructure costs. He lost a bid for re-election in 1972 after renouncing a pledge to veto any attempt to institute an  income or sales tax. In later years, he warned the state Republican party against becoming too far right on the political spectrum.

Life after politics
After Peterson's term as governor, he became President of Franklin Pierce College in 1975, and served until his retirement in 1995. He also served one year as president of the University of New Hampshire. In 1996 he became a trustee of the University System of New Hampshire.  The University built a residence hall named SERC Hall B In 2007, on October 11, 2013, this hall was renamed to Peterson Hall in his honor.

During the 2008 election cycle, Peterson served as honorary chairman of John McCain's campaign during the New Hampshire primary, and as Chairman of Republicans for Lynch, a group of Republicans supporting the re-election of Democratic governor John Lynch. At age 86, his name emerged as a possible appointee to the United States Senate if Judd Gregg accepted the offer to serve as Secretary of Commerce in the cabinet of President Barack Obama. Gregg, however, subsequently withdrew his name from consideration after he was nominated.

Death
In March 2011, Peterson (who was not a smoker) was diagnosed with lung cancer. He died on June 1.

References

External links
Peterson at New Hampshire's Division of Historic Resources

1922 births
2011 deaths
Republican Party governors of New Hampshire
Speakers of the New Hampshire House of Representatives
Republican Party members of the New Hampshire House of Representatives
Dartmouth College alumni
College of William & Mary alumni
Franklin Pierce University faculty
Presidents of the University of New Hampshire
Deaths from lung cancer
People from Peterborough, New Hampshire
United States Navy personnel of World War II
New Hampton School alumni